Howardena Pindell (born April 14, 1943) is an American artist, curator, and educator. She is known as a painter and mixed media artist, her work explores texture, color, structures, and the process of making art; it is often political, addressing the intersecting issues of racism, feminism, violence, slavery, and exploitation. She is known for the wide variety of techniques and materials used in her artwork; she has created abstract paintings, collages, "video drawings," and "process art."

Early life and education
Howardena Pindell was born on April 14, 1943, in Philadelphia, Pennsylvania, and was raised in the neighborhood of Germantown. Her parents were Mildred (née Lewis) and Howard Douglas Pindell, she was an only child. She graduated from the Philadelphia High School for Girls. From a young age, she demonstrated promise in figurative art classes at the Philadelphia College of Art, the Fleisher Art Memorial, and the Tyler School of Art.

She received her BFA degree in 1965 from Boston University, and her MFA degree in 1967 from Yale University. Pindell had studied color theory under Sewell Sillman.

Career 
In 1967, Pindell began working in the Arts Education Department at the Museum of Modern Art (MoMA) in New York City, later moving on to a curatorial position in the Department of Prints and Illustrated Books. She would continue to work at MoMA for the next 12 years (until 1979) in a variety of capacities, including exhibit assistant, curatorial assistant, and associate curator.

In 1972, Pindell co-founded the A.I.R. Gallery, which was the first artist-directed gallery for women artists in the United States. There were twenty artist cofounders, including Nancy Spero, Agnes Denes, Barbara Zucker, Dotty Attie, Judith Bernstein, Harmony Hammond, Maude Boltz, Louise Kramer, and others.  At the first meeting, held on March 17, 1972, Pindell suggested naming the gallery the "Eyre Gallery" after the novel Jane Eyre by Charlotte Brontë. The artists decided to name the gallery "A.I.R. Gallery" instead, which stands for "Artists in Residence." The gallery allowed women artists to curate their own exhibitions, allowing them the freedom to take risks with their work in ways that commercial galleries would not.

In the mid-1970s, she began traveling abroad as a guest speaker and lecturer. Her seminars included "Current American and Black American Art: A Historical Survey" at the Madras College of Arts and Crafts in India, 1975, and "Black Artists, U.S.A." at the Academy of Art in Oslo, Norway, 1976.

By 1977, she was associate curator of MoMA's department of Prints and Illustrated Books.  She continued to spend her nights creating her own pieces, drawing inspiration from many of the exhibits hosted by MoMA, especially the museum's collection of Akan batakari tunics in the exhibit African Textiles and Decorative Arts. While working at MoMA, Pindell created a statistical report spanning 7 years where she surveyed art institutions and galleries in New York state that were featuring representation by Black, Asian, Hispanic, and Native American artists and designers. Her statistical findings were published in March 1989 issue of ARTnews, and found that 54 out of 64 of the surveyed art institutions and galleries (in New York state) represented 90% or greater white artists.

Currently, Pindell is a professor of art at Stony Brook University, where she has taught since 1979. She was a visiting professor in the art department at Yale University from 1995–1999.

She was interviewed for the film !Women Art Revolution (2010).

Artistic style

Following her graduation from the MFA program specializing in painting at Yale University in 1967, Pindell moved to New York City. It was in New York City where she began to work with abstraction and collaging, finding inspiration in the work of fellow grad school student Nancy Silvia Murata. By the 1970s, she began developing a unique style, rooted in the use of dots and reminiscent of minimalism and pointillism. From working with dots, Pindell began making use of the scrap circles of oaktag paper that resulted from the production of her pointillist works. David Bourdon writes, "By 1974, Pindell developed a more three-dimensional and more personal form of pointillism, wielding a paper punch to cut out multitudes of confetti-like disks, which she dispersed with varying degrees of premeditation and randomness over the surfaces of her pictures." One example of this is a 17 x 90 inch, untitled drawing-collage from 1973; Pindell used over 20 thousand hand-numbered paper dots to form vertical and horizontal rows with rhythmic peacefulness, uniting order and chaos .

In 1969, Pindell gained recognition for her participation in the exhibition American Drawing Biennial XXIII at the Norfolk Museum of Arts and Sciences, and by 1972, had her first major exhibition at Spelman College in Atlanta.

In 1973, her work with circles received acclaim at a show in the A.I.R. (Artists-In-Residence) Gallery in SoHo where her style had solidified into expression through "large-scale, untitled, nonrepresentational, abstract paintings". Also in 1973,  Pindell began work on her "Video Drawings" series. At the advice of her doctor, Pindell bought a television for her studio to encourage her from working long hours on her dot works. She became interested in the artificial light from her television monitor, and began to write out small numerals on acetate, which she stuck to the TV screen. She then photographed her drawings placed over the monitor. These experiments lead to a long series of works that feature her drawings over sporting events and news broadcastings, including televised elections.

The spray paintings of the early 1970s, which made use of the scrap pieces of paper from which holes had been punched, were dark and smoldering, yet there was also a shimmering light. This appearance of light would carry on as Pindell began building up the punched out dots on the canvas, sometimes even sprinkling glitter across the surface, too. These canvases were rich visual feasts of color and light.

In these years, Pindell also describes feeling great influence in her work from the Black Power and feminist movements, as well as from exposure to new art forms during her day job at MoMA and her travels abroad (particularly to Africa). She became fascinated by African sculpture exhibited at MoMA and in the Brooklyn Museum of Art, and began to mirror the practice of encoding and accumulation in her own work. The material of these pieces also informed Pindell's work: while African art embraces the use of objects in sculpture such as beads, horns, shells, hair, and claws, so Pindell's collages began to incorporate additional elements including paper, glitter, acrylic, and dye.

By the 1980s, Pindell was also working on unstretched canvas. A few large scale works have a similar effect of looking totally white from a distance but actually being made up of tiny dots of colored paper, sequins, and paint. Pindell likened this experience of viewing her paintings to whitewashing her own identity to make it more palatable for the art world. However, she also was met with criticism because this work was not overtly political in appearance. At this time, she also began combining the ideas of the video drawings and the hole punched works; she started adding numbers to each individual hole punch and arranging them in extremely neat rows.

In 1979, Pindell was in a traumatic car accident, from which she suffered severe memory loss.  It was at this point that her work became much more autobiographical, in part as an effort to help herself heal. Her painting Autobiography, which was part of an eight-painting series on her recovery, used Pindell's own body as the focal point. For this piece, she cut and sewed a traced outline of herself onto a large piece of canvas as part of a complex collage. She also started collaging postcards from friends and from her own travels into her work. She'd often cut the postcards into angular strips and paste them an inch or so apart, leaving room to paint between the strips. The repetition of forms created a vibrating, fractured feel. Her reason for using postcards was to spark her memory that had been affected in the car accident.

In 1980, she made a video called Free, White, and 21, in which she appears in a blonde wig, dark glasses, and with a pale stocking over her head as a caricature of a white woman, discussing instances of racism that she has experienced throughout her life. "You really must be paranoid," Pindell says performing the white woman, "I have never had experiences like that. But, of course, I am free, white and 21." Soon she began expending a particular focus on racism in the art world, a subject on which she has published multiple writings. In 1980, she openly addressed the persistent presence of racism even within the feminist movement, organizing a show at A.I.R. Gallery titled The Dialectics of Isolation: An Exhibition of Third World Women Artists of the US. She became increasingly aware that she had often been selected for exhibition as a token black among a group of other artists, she and Carolyn Martin cofounded a cross-generational black women's artist collective called "Entitled: Black Women Artists," that has since grown to international membership, likely thanks to Pindell's consistent travel and lecturing. Over the years, she has visited five continents and lived in Japan, Sweden, and India for periods of time, all the while producing new work, and lecturing/writing on racism and the art community.

Throughout the 1980s, she continued to work with expressions of identity through her painting, particularly on her own negotiation of multiple identities, as her heritage includes African, European, Seminole, Central American, and Afro-Caribbean roots, along with her position as ethnically Jewish, raised Christian.  During this time, her pieces also became increasingly political, addressing women's issues, racism, child abuse, slavery, and AIDS. According to Pindell, among critics of this new work, "There was a nostalgia for my non-issue related work of the 1970s."

In the 1990s, Pindell displayed a series of memorial works and a sequence of "word" paintings, in which her body in silhouette is overlaid with words such as "slave trade." This later series is reminiscent of an earlier work about South Africa that features a slashed canvas roughly stitched back together and the word "INTERROGATION" laid on top.

In the late 1940s, early 1950s, Howardena gained inspiration for her more circular artworks from a root beer bottle she saw while with her parents in Ohio. The bottom of the mug had a big red circle on it, a mark once placed on dishes and silverware used to serve people of color in the south.

Exhibitions

Since her first major show at Spelman in 1971, Pindell has exhibited in a number of solo and group exhibitions.

Solo exhibitions

1971
Paintings and Drawings by Howardena Pindell, Rockefeller Memorial Galleries, Spelman College, Atlanta, November 7–23
 
1973
Howardena Pindell, A.I.R. Gallery, New York
Howardena Pindell, Douglass College Art Gallery, Rutgers University, New Brunswick, New Jersey
 
1974
Howardena Pindell: Paintings and Drawings, Michael C. Rockefeller Arts Center, State University of New York, Fredonia
 
1976–1977
Howardena Pindell: Video Drawings, Henie-Onstad Kunstsenter, Høvikodden, Norway; Kunstforeningen, Copenhagen; Fyns Stiftsmuseum, Odense, Denmark; Vassar College Art Gallery, Poughkeepsie, New York; Student Union Gallery, University of Massachusetts, Amherst
 
1977
Howardena Pindell, Just Above Midtown, Inc., New York

1978
Howardena Pindell, Art Academy of Cincinnati
 
1979
Howardena Pindell: Works on Paper, Canvas and Video Drawings, State University of New York at Stony Brook
 
1980
Howardena Pindell: New Works on Paper and Canvas, Lerner-Heller Gallery, New York, April 5–30
 
1981
Howardena Pindell: Recent Works on Canvas, Lerner-Heller Gallery, New York, April 4–29
Howardena Pindell: Recent Works on Paper, Monique Knowlton Gallery, New York, April 4–May 2
 
1983
Howardena Pindell, Memory Series: Japan, A.I.R. Gallery, New York, February 1–19
 
1985
Howardena Pindell: Traveler’s Memories, Japan, Birmingham Museum of Art, Alabama, January 20–March 17
Howardena Pindell: Traveler’s Memories, India, David Heath Gallery, Atlanta, February 5–March 2
 
1986
Howardena Pindell: Odyssey, The Studio Museum in Harlem, New York, February 12–June 12
Howardena Pindell, Harris-Brown Gallery, Boston
Howardena Pindell: Recent Work, Grand Rapids Art Museum, Michigan
 
1987
Howardena Pindell, G. R. N’Namdi Gallery, Detroit, September 25–November 7
 
1989
Howardena Pindell, Wadsworth Atheneum, Hartford, Connecticut, March 25–June 18
Howardena Pindell: Autobiography, Cyrus Gallery, New York, October 5–November 18
 
1990
Howardena Pindell, Grove Gallery, State University of New York, Albany, October 11–November 30
 
1992
Howardena Pindell, David Heath Gallery, Atlanta
Howardena Pindell, G.R. N’Namdi Gallery, Birmingham, Michigan
Howardena Pindell: A Retrospective 1972–1992, Bevier Gallery, Rochester Institute of Technology, Rochester, NY, Nov 13 to Dec 9 
 
1993
Howardena Pindell: A Retrospective 1972–1992, Art Gallery, Georgia State University, Atlanta, July 14–August 13
 
1995
Howardena Pindell, G.R. N’Namdi Gallery, Birmingham, Michigan
 
1996
Howardena Pindell: Mixed Media on Canvas, Johnson Gallery, Bethel University, St. Paul, Minnesota, January 2–February 29
Howardena Pindell, G.R. N’Namdi Gallery, Chicago
 
1999
Witness to Our Time: A Decade of Work by Howardena Pindell, Heckscher Museum of Art, Huntington, New York
 
2000
Howardena Pindell: Collages, G.R. N’Namdi Gallery, Birmingham, Michigan
Howardena Pindell: Recent Work, G.R. N’Namdi Gallery, Chicago
 
2001
Howardena Pindell: An Intimate Retrospective, Harriet Tubman Museum, Macon, Georgia, March 7–April 7
 
2002
Howardena Pindell, Diggs Gallery, Winston-Salem State University, North Carolina
 
2003
Howardena Pindell, G.R. N’Namdi Gallery, Detroit
 
2004
Howardena Pindell: Works on Paper, 1968–2004, Sragow Gallery, New York, April 3–June 5
Howardena Pindell: Visual Affinities, Heckscher Museum of Art, Huntington, NY, May 15–June 27
 
2006
Howardena Pindell: In My Lifetime, G.R. N’Namdi Gallery, New York, June 3–August 31
 
2007
Howardena Pindell: Hidden Histories, Louisiana Art and Science Museum, Baton Rouge, January 10–April 5
 
2009
Howardena Pindell: Autobiography: Strips, Dots, and Video, 1974–2009, Sandler Hudson Gallery, Atlanta, October 23–November 28
 
2013
Howardena Pindell: Video Drawings, 1973–2007, Howard Yezerski Gallery, Boston, March 15–April 16
 
2014
Howardena Pindell: Paintings, 1974–1980, Garth Greenan Gallery, New York, April 10–May 17
 
2015
Howardena Pindell, Honor Fraser, Los Angeles, September 11–October 29, 2015
Howardena Pindell, Spelman College Museum of Fine Art, Atlanta, August 25–December 5

2017
Howardena Pindell: Recent Paintings, Garth Greenan Gallery, New York, October 26–December 16
 
2018
Howardena Pindell: What Remains to Be Seen, Museum of Contemporary Art, Chicago, February 24–May 20, and Virginia Museum of Fine Arts, Richmond, August 25, 2018 – November 25, 2018

2019
Howardena Pindell: What Remains to Be Seen, Rose Art Museum, Brandeis University, February 1–May 19, 2019
2020
 Howardena Pindell: Rope/Fire/Water, The Shed, New York, NY, October 16, 2020 – March 28, 2021
2022
 Howardena Pindell: A New Language, Kettle's Yard, Cambridge, UK, July 2, 2022 – October 30, 2022 (first solo institutional exhibition in the UK)

Group exhibitions
1969
XXIII American Drawing Biennial, Norfolk Museum of Arts and Sciences, Virginia, February 2–March 9
 
1971
Contemporary Black Artists in America, Whitney Museum of American Art, New York, April 6–May 16
26 Contemporary Women Artists, Aldrich Museum of Contemporary Art, Ridgefield, Connecticut, April 18–June 13
 
1972
1972 Annual Exhibition: Contemporary American Painting, Whitney Museum of American Art, New York, January 25–March 19
A New Vitality in Art: The Black Woman, John and Norah Warbeke Gallery, Mount Holyoke College, South Hadley, Massachusetts, April 6–30
American Women Artists, Kunsthaus Hamburg, April 14–May 14
Unlikely Photography, Institute of Contemporary Arts, London, August 5–September 26
 
1973
Harmony Hammond and Howardena Pindell, A.I.R. Gallery, New York, January 13–31
Yngre Amerikansk Kunst: Tegninger og Grafik, Gentofte Rådhus, Copenhagen, January 24–February 11; Aarhus Kunstmuseum, Denmark, February 18–March 4; Henie-Onstad Kunstsenter, Høvikodden, Norway, March 18–April 15; Hamburger Kunsthalle, Hamburg, April 28–June 11; Moderna Museum, Stockholm, September 15–October 21
New American Graphic Art, Fogg Art Museum, Harvard University, September 12–October 28
Blacks: USA: 1973, New York Cultural Center, New York, September 26–November 15
 
1974
Painting and Sculpture Today, Indianapolis Museum of Art, May 22–July 14; Contemporary Art Center and Taft Museum, Cincinnati, September 12–October 26
Five American Women in Paris, Galerie Gerald Piltzer, Paris, February
Paperworks, Rosa Esman Gallery, New York
 
1975
Artists Make Toys, Clocktower Gallery, New York, January 1–15
Color, Image, Light, Women's Interart Center, New York, November 13–30
Art on Paper, Weatherspoon Art Gallery, University of North Carolina, Greensboro, November 16–December 14
 
1975–1976
Painting, Drawing, and Sculpture of the ’60s and ’70s from the Dorothy and Herbert Vogel Collection, Institute of Contemporary Art, University of Pennsylvania, Philadelphia, October 7–November 18, 1975; Contemporary Arts Center, Cincinnati, December 17, 1975 – February 15, 1976
 
1976
Rooms: P.S.1, Institute for Art and Urban Resources, Queens, New York, June 9–26
Project Rebuild, Grey Art Gallery & Study Center, New York University, New York, August 11–27
American Artists ’76: A Celebration, Marion Koogler McNay Art Institute, San Antonio
Photonotations, Rosa Esman Gallery, New York
Works on Paper, Monique Knowlton Gallery, New York
 
1976–1977
The Handmade Paper Object, Santa Barbara Museum of Art, October 29–November 28, 1976; Oakland Museum of California, December 21, 1976–February 6, 1977; Institute of Contemporary Arts, Boston, May 10–June 14, 1977
 
1976–1979
Herbert Distel: The Museum of Drawers, Museum der Stadt Solothurn, Switzerland, October 29–November 28, 1976; International Curatorial Centrum, Antwerp, December 18, 1976–January 9, 1977; Museum Schwäbisch Gmünd, Germany, January 23–February 20, 1977; Cooper-Hewitt Museum, New York, March 21–May 7, 1978; New Orleans Museum of Art, August 25–October 15, 1978; Wadsworth Atheneum, Hartford, November–December, 1978; Kunstmuseum Bern, Switzerland, May 2–June 10, 1979
 
1977
The Material Dominant: Some Current Artists and Their Media, Pennsylvania State University Museum of Art, University Park, January 29–March 27
Drawing and Collage: Selections from the New York University Collection, Grey Art Gallery & Study Center, New York University, New York, June 1–July 1
Patterning and Decoration, Museum of the American Foundation for the Arts, Miami, October 7–November 30
 
1977–1978
Works from the Collection of Dorothy and Herbert Vogel, University of Michigan Museum of Art, Ann Arbor, November 11, 1977–January 1, 1978
New Ways with Paper, National Collection of Fine Arts, Smithsonian Institution, December 2, 1977–February 20, 1978
 
1978
Overview, 1972–1977: An Exhibition in Two Parts, A.I.R. Gallery, New York, March 5–April 9
Thick Paint, Renaissance Society at the University of Chicago, October 1–November 8
 
1979
Visual Poetry and Language Art, California Polytechnic State University, San Luis Obispo, March 26–April 13
As We See Ourselves: Artists’ Self-Portraits, Heckscher Museum of Art, Huntington, New York, June 22–August 5
Another Generation, The Studio Museum in Harlem, New York
 
1980
Howardena Pindell and Jack Whitten, Holman Hall Gallery, Trenton State College, February 14–29
Fire and Water: Paper as Art, Rockland Center for the Arts, West Nyack, New York, March 30–May 4
 
1980–1984
Afro-American Abstraction: An Exhibition of Painting and Sculpture by Nineteen Black American Artists, Institute for Art and Urban Resources, P.S. 1 Contemporary Art Center, Queens, New York, February 17–April 6, 1980; Everson Museum of Art, Syracuse, New York, February 6–March 29, 1981; Los Angeles Municipal Art Gallery, July 1–August 30, 1982; Oakland Museum of California, November 13, 1982 – January 2, 1983; Brooks Memorial Art Gallery, Memphis, February 2–March 20, 1983; The Art Center, South Bend, Indiana, September 4–October 16, 1983; Toledo Museum of Art, Ohio, January 22–February 26, 1984; Bellevue Art Museum, Washington, March 25–May 6, 1984; Laguna Gloria Art Museum, Austin, June 1–July 15, 1984; Mississippi Museum of Art, Jackson, September 14–November 4, 1984
 
1981
Stay Tuned, New Museum of Contemporary Art, New York, July 25–September 10
Five on Fabric, Laguna Gloria Art Museum, Austin, August 28–October 11
 
1982
Nancy Reagan Fashion Show, Printed Matter, New York, April 1–30
 
1982–1983
On Trial: Yale School of Art, 22 Wooster Gallery, New York, December 29, 1982 – January 8, 1983
 
1983
All that Glitters, Tweed Gallery, Plainfield, New Jersey, May 11–June 18
Keeping Culture Alive: Artists’ Housing in New York, Urban Center Galleries, Municipal Art Society, New York, August 22–September 17
Language, Drama, Source, and Vision, New Museum of Contemporary Art, New York, October 8–November 27
The Television Show: Video Photographs, Robert Freidus Gallery, New York
 
1984
A Celebration of American Women Artists: Part II, the Recent Generation, Sidney Janis Gallery, New York, February 11–March 3
ID: An Exhibition of Third World Woman Photographers, Institute for Art and Urban Resources, P.S. 1 Contemporary Art Center, Queens, New York, October 14–December 9
Labor Intensive Abstraction, The Clocktower, New York, November 8–December 8
 
1985–1986
Adornments, Bernice Steinbaum Gallery, New York, December 10, 1985 – January 4, 1986
 
1985–1987
Tradition and Conflict: Images of a Turbulent Decade, 1963–1973, The Studio Museum in Harlem, New York, January 27–June 30, 1985; Lang Gallery, Scripps College, Claremont, California, January 19–February 20, 1986; Heckscher Museum of Art, Huntington, New York, March 22–April 17, 1986; Museum of the Center for Afro-American Artists, Boston, May 18–June 22, 1986; Peninsula Fine Arts Center, Newport News, Virginia, August 11–September 26, 1986; Museum of Art and Archaeology, University of Missouri, Columbia, November 15, 1986 – January 4, 1987; David and Alfred Smart Gallery, University of Chicago, May 15–June 30, 1987; Arkansas Arts Center, Little Rock, August 7–September 20, 1987; Tower Fine Arts Gallery, State University of New York, Brockport, October 9–November 15, 1987
 
1986
Transitions: The Afro-American Artist, Bergen Museum of Art and Science, Paramus, New Jersey, February 1–26
In Homage to Ana Mendieta, Zeus-Trabia Gallery, New York, February 6–25
Progressions: A Cultural Legacy, The Clocktower, New York, February 13–March 15
Television’s Impact on Contemporary Art, Queens Museum, New York, September 13–October 26
Masters of Color, Harris-Brown Gallery, Boston, October 15–November 15
 
1987
Race and Representation, Art Gallery, Hunter College, City University of New York, January 26–March 6
The Afro-American Artist in the Age of Cultural Pluralism, Montclair Art Museum, New Jersey, February 1–March 8
9 Uptown, Harlem School of the Arts, New York, April 11–May 9
Home, Goddard-Riverside Community Center, New York, May 8–31
 
1987–1988
Outrageous Women, Ceres Gallery, New York, December 2, 1987 – January 1, 1988
 
1988
1938–1988: The Work of Five Black Women Artists, Art Gallery, Atlanta College of Art, July 8–August 7
 
1988–1989
The Turning Point: Art and Politics in 1968, Cleveland Center for Contemporary Art, September 9–October 16, 1988; Art Gallery, Lehman College, City University of New York, Bronx, November 10, 1988 – January 14, 1989
Art as a Verb: The Evolving Continuum, Maryland Institute College of Art, Baltimore, November 21, 1988 – January 8, 1989; Metropolitan Life Gallery, New York, March 6–April 8, 1989; The *Studio Museum in Harlem, New York, March 12–June 18, 1989
Alice and Look Who Else, Through the Looking Glass, Bernice Steinbaum Gallery, New York, December 10, 1988 – January 7, 1989
 
1989
Bridges and Boundaries, Newhouse Center for Contemporary Art, Staten Island, New York, January 7–February 19
Making Their Mark: Women Artists Move into the Mainstream, 1970–1985, Cincinnati Art Museum, February 22–April 2; New Orleans Museum of Art, May 6–June 8; Denver Art Museum, July 22–September 10; Pennsylvania Academy of the Fine Arts, Philadelphia, October 20–December 31
On the Cutting Edge: 10 Curators Choose 30 Artists, Fine Arts Museum of Long Island, Hempstead, New York, April 16–June 25
 
1990
The Decade Show: Frameworks of Identity in the 1980s, New Museum of Contemporary Art, New York, May 12–August 19; Museum of Contemporary Hispanic Art, New York, May 16–August 18; The Studio Museum in Harlem, New York, May 19–August 18
Figuring the Body, Museum of Fine Arts, Boston, July 28–October 28
 
1991
Center Margins, Howard Yezerski Gallery, January–February 6 
Aspects of Collage, Guild Hall Museum, New York, May 5–June 9
 
1995
Chess and Checkers, Exit Art, New York, September 23–October 25
 
1996
Sexual Politics: Judy Chicago’s Dinner Party in Feminist Art History, Armand Hammer Museum of Art and Cultural Center, University of California, Los Angeles, April 24–August 18
Thinking Print: Books to Billboards, 1980–95, Museum of Modern Art, New York, June 20–September 10
 
1996–1998
Sniper’s Nest: Art that Has Lived with Lucy R. Lippard, Center for Curatorial Studies, Bard College, Annandale-on-Hudson, New York, October 28–December 22, 1996; Scales Fine Arts Center, Wake Forest University, Winston-Salem, North Carolina, January 15–April 10, 1997; Blanton Museum of Art, University of Texas, Austin, June 6–July 20, 1997; Spencer Museum of Art, University of Kansas, Lawrence, November 2–December 21, 1997; New Mexico Museum of Art, Santa Fe, April 24–September 28, 1998
 
1996–1999
Bearing Witness: Contemporary Works by African American Women Artists, Museum of Fine Art, Spelman College, Atlanta, July 16–December 31, 1996; Fort Wayne Museum of Art, Indiana, February 1–March 30, 1997; Polk Museum of Art, Lakeland, Florida, November 4, 1997 – January 7, 1998; The Columbus Museum, Columbus, Georgia, January 25–March 16, 1998; African-American Museum, Dallas, April 6–May 19, 1998; Minnesota Museum of American Art, St. Paul, June 9–August 11, 1998; Kennedy Museum of American Art, Ohio University, Athens, September 1–October 14, 1998; Gibbes Museum of Art, Charleston, November 4, 1998 – January 7, 1999; Ulrich Museum of Art, Wichita, January 28–March 16, 1999; Portland Museum of Art, Portland, Maine, April 6–May 30, 1999; Museum of Fine Arts, Houston, June 19–August 15, 1999; African-American Historical and Cultural Museum of the San Joaquin Valley, Fresno, California, September 4–October 8, 1999
 
1998 
Women Artists in the Vogel Collection, Brenau University, Gainesville, Georgia, February 5–April 5
Not for Sale: Feminism and Art in the USA during the 1970s, Apex Art, New York, February 12–March 14
 
2000
An Exuberant Bounty: Prints and Drawings by African Americans, Philadelphia Museum of Art, February 5–April 16
Hidden Histories: African American Slavery and the Philippine Struggle for Independence after the War of 1898, Pro Arts, Oakland, California, March 8–April 15
 
2002
Outer and Inner Space: A Video Exhibition in Three Parts, Virginia Museum of Fine Arts, Richmond, January 18–August 18
Math-Art/Art-Math, Selby Gallery, Ringling College of Art and Design, Sarasota, Florida, February 22–March 30
 
2002–2004
In the Spirit of Martin: The Living Legacy of Dr. Martin Luther King, Jr., Charles H. Wright Museum of African American History, Detroit, January 12–August 4, 2002; Bass Museum of Art, Miami Beach, September 7–December 1, 2002; Frederick R. Weisman Art Museum, Minneapolis, January 4–April 6, 2003; International Gallery, Smithsonian Institution, Washington, DC, May 15–July 27, 2003; Memphis Brooks Museum of Art, Memphis, August 30–November 9, 2003; Montgomery Museum of Fine Arts, Alabama, December 20, 2003 – March 28, 2004
 
2003
Layers of Meaning: Collage and Abstraction in the Late 20th Century, Pennsylvania Academy of the Fine Arts, Philadelphia, February 8–April 27
Wish You Were Here, Too, A.I.R. Gallery, New York, June 24–July 19
 
2003–2004
Strange Days, Museum of Contemporary Art, Chicago, September 20, 2003 – July 4, 2004

2004
Something to Look Forward to, Phillips Museum of Art, Franklin & Marshall College, Lancaster, Pennsylvania, March 26–June 27
 
2004–2005
Creating Their Own Image, Arnold and Sheila Aronson Galleries, Sheila C. Johnson Design Center, The New School, New York, November 26, 2004 – January 30, 2005
 
2005
Double Consciousness: Black Conceptual Art since 1970, Contemporary Arts Museum, Houston, January 22–April 17
Bodies of Evidence: Contemporary Perspectives, Museum of Art, Rhode Island School of Design, Providence, July 1–September 25
 
2006
An Atlas of Drawings: Transforming Chronologies, Museum of Modern Art, New York, January 26–October 2
Driven to Abstraction: Contemporary Work by American Artists, New York State Museum, Albany, January 28–March 26
Energy/Experimentation: Black Artists and Abstraction, 1964–1980, The Studio Museum in Harlem, New York, April 5–July 2
High Times, Hard Times: New York Painting, 1967–1975, Weatherspoon Art Museum, University of North Carolina, Greensboro, August 6–October 15, 2006; American University Museum at the Katzen Arts Center, American University, Washington, DC, November 21, 2006 – January 21, 2007; National Academy Museum, New York, February 13–April 22, 2007

2007
For the Love of the Game: Race and Sport in African-American Art, Wadsworth Atheneum, Hartford, Connecticut, June 1–November 30
WACK! Art and the Feminist Revolution, Museum of Contemporary Art, Los Angeles, March 4–July 16, 2007; National Museum of Women in the Arts, Washington, DC, September 21–December 16, 2007; P.S. 1 Contemporary Art Center, Queens, New York, February 17–May 12, 2008; Vancouver Art Gallery, October 4, 2008 – January 18, 2009
Lines, Grids, Stains, Words, Museum of Modern Art, New York, June 13–October 22, 2007; Museu de Arte Contemporânea de Serralves, Porto, Portugal, May 9–June 22, 2008; Museum Wiesbaden, Germany, September 28, 2008 – January 1, 2009
Cinema Remixed and Reloaded: Black Women Artists and the Moving Image since 1970, Museum of Fine Art, Spelman College, Atlanta, September 14, 2007 – May 28, 2008; Contemporary Arts Museum, Houston, October 18, 2008 – January 4, 2009
 
2008
Strength in Numbers: Artists Respond to Conflict, Sragow Gallery, New York, June 3–July 31
 
2009
Paper: Pressed, Stained, Slashed, Folded, Museum of Modern Art, New York, March 11–June 22
Hidden Gems: Works on Paper, June Kelly Gallery, New York, July 9–31
 
2010
The Chemistry of Color: African-American Artists in Philadelphia, 1970–1990, Pennsylvania Academy of the Fine Arts, Philadelphia, January 11–April 10
Collected: Reflections on the Permanent Collection, The Studio Museum in Harlem, New York, April 1–June 27
Pictures by Women: A History of Modern Photography, Museum of Modern Art, New York, May 7, 2010 – April 18, 2011
Embodied: Black Identities in American Art from the Yale University Art Gallery, David C. Driskell Center, University of Maryland, College Park, September 16–October 29, 2010; Yale University Art Gallery, New Haven, Connecticut, September 16, 2010 – June 26, 2011

2011
Currents in Contemporary Art, Orlando Museum of Art, Orlando, Florida, January 1–June 30
VideoStudio: Playback, The Studio Museum in Harlem, March 31–June 26
 
2012
Full Spectrum: Prints from the Brandywine Workshop, Philadelphia Museum of Art, September 7–November 25
 
2013
Black in the Abstract, Part I: Epistrophy, Contemporary Arts Museum, Houston, October 31, 2013 – January 19, 2014
 
2014
Art Expanded, 1958–1978, Walker Art Center, Minneapolis, Minnesota, June 14, 2014 – March 8, 2015
Variation: Conversations in and around Abstract Painting, Los Angeles County Museum of Art, August 24, 2014 – March 22, 2015
Go Stand Next to The Mountain, Hales Gallery, London, November 28, 2014 – January 24, 2015
 
2015
Represent: 200 Years of African American Art, Philadelphia Museum of Art, January 10–April 5
New Acquisitions, Rose Art Museum, Brandeis University, Waltham, Massachusetts, February 11–June 7
Piece Work, 32 Edgewood Gallery, Yale University School of Art, New Haven, Connecticut,  April 6–May 24
America Is Hard to See,  Whitney Museum of American Art, New York, May 1–September 27
H
Greater New York, MoMA P.S. 1, Queens, New York, October 11, 2015 – March 7, 2016
Marks Made, Museum of Fine Arts, St. Petersburg, Florida, October 17, 2015 – January 24, 2016
Painting 2.0: Expression in the Information Age, Museum Brandhorst, Munich, November 13, 2015 – April 15, 2016; Museum Moderner Kunst, Vienna, June 2–September 25, 2016 
You Go Girl! Celebrating Women Artists, Heckscher Museum of Art, Huntington, New York, December 5, 2015 – April 3, 2016
 
2016
Blue and Black: African Rainbow, University of Delaware, Newark, February 10–May 15
Surface Area: Selections from the Permanent Collection, The Studio Museum in Harlem, New York, March 24–June 26
Hey You! Who Me?, 32 Edgewood Gallery, Yale University School of Art, New Haven, Connecticut, April 6–June 5
FORTY, MoMA P.S. 1, Queens, New York, June 19–August 29
Skins: Body as Matter and Process, Garth Greenan Gallery, New York, June 23–July 29
Haptic, Alexander Gray Associates, New York, July 7–August 12
The African American Narrative, Maitland Art Center, Florida, July 15–September 4
Her Wherever, Halsey McKay Gallery, East Hampton, October 8 – November 13
Real / Radical / Psychological: The Collection on Display, Mildred Kemper Art Museum, St. Louis, September 9, 2016 – January 15, 2017
Reading the Image: Text in American Art Since 1969, Lyman Allyn Art Museum, New London, CT, October 8, 2016 – January 22, 2017
Art AIDS America, Alphawood Gallery, December 1, 2016 – April 2, 2017
 
2017
Expanding Tradition: Selections from the Larry D. and Brenda A. Thompson Collection, Georgia Museum of Art, University of Georgia, Athens, January 28–May 7
Picturing Math: Selections from the Department of Drawings and Prints, Metropolitan Museum of Art, New York, January 31–May 1
Masterclass: A Survey of Work from the Twentieth Century, Pavel Zoubok Gallery, New York, February 28–April 8
A Birthday Present as a Watch: Ketuta Alexi-Meskhishvili, Talia Chetrit, Ann Craven, Howardena Pindell, Thea Djordjadze and Hannah Weinberger, Galerie Frank Elbaz, Paris, March 18–June 17
Power, Sprüth Magers, Los Angeles, March 29–June 10
Painting on the Edge: A Historical Survey, Stephen Friedman Gallery, London, June 8–July 29
20/20: The Studio Museum in Harlem and Carnegie Museum of Art, Carnegie Museum of Art, Pittsburgh, July 22–December 31
Time as Landscape: Inquiries of Art and Science, Cornell Fine Arts Museum, Rollins College, Winter Park, Florida, September 28–December 31
We Wanted a Revolution: Black Radical Women, 1965–85, Brooklyn Museum, New York, April 21–September 17, 2017; California African American Museum, Los Angeles, October 13, 2017 – January 14, 2018; Albright-Knox Art Gallery, Buffalo, February 17–May 27, 2018; Institute of Contemporary Art, Boston, June 26–September 30, 2018
Magnetic Fields: Expanding American Abstraction, 1960s to Today, Kemper Museum of Contemporary Art, Kansas City, Missouri, June 8–September 17, 2017; National Museum of Women in the Arts, Washington, D.C., October 13, 2017 – January 21, 2018; Museum of Fine Arts, St. Petersburg, Florida, May 5–August 5, 2018
An Incomplete History of Protest: Selections from the Whitney's Collection, 1940–2017, Whitney Museum of American Art, New York, August 18, 2017–April 2018
Delirious: Art at the Limits of Reason, 1950-1980, Metropolitan Museum of Art, September 13, 2017 – January 21, 2018
Soul of a Nation: Art in the Age of Black Power, Tate Modern, London, July 12–October 22, 2017; Crystal Bridges Museum of American Art, Bentonville, Arkansas, February 2–April 23, 2018; Brooklyn Museum, New York, September 7, 2018 – February 3, 2019
 
2018
Histórias Afro-Atlânticas, Museu de Arte de São Paulo Assis Chateaubriand, Brazil, June 28–October 21
Outliers and American Vanguard Art, National Gallery, Washington D.C., January 28–May 13, 2018; High Museum of Art, Atlanta, June 24–September 30, 2018; Los Angeles County Museum of Art, November 18, 2018 – March 18, 2019

Collections
Brooklyn Museum, Brooklyn, New York
Corcoran Gallery of Art, Washington, D.C.
Everson Museum of Art, Syracuse, New York
Fogg Art Museum, Harvard University.
Heckscher Museum of Art, Huntington, New York
Henie Onstad Kunstsenter, Høvikodden, Norway
High Museum of Art, Atlanta, Georgia
Institute of Contemporary Art Boston, Boston, Massachusetts
Kemper Art Museum, Washington University in St. Louis.
Louisiana Museum of Modern Art, Copenhagen, Denmark
Metropolitan Museum of Art, New York City, New York
Mint Museum of Art, Charlotte, North Carolina
Museum of Contemporary Art, Chicago, Illinois
Museum of Fine Arts, Boston, Boston, Massachusetts
Museum of Fine Arts, Houston, Texas
Museum of Modern Art, New York City, New York
National Academy Museum, New York
National Gallery of Art, Washington, D.C.
Newark Museum, New Jersey
Pennsylvania Academy of the Fine Arts, Philadelphia, Pennsylvania
Philadelphia Museum of Art, Philadelphia, Pennsylvania
Neuberger Museum of Art, Purchase College, State University of New York
Smithsonian Museum of American Art, Washington, D.C.
The Studio Museum in Harlem, New York City, New York
Virginia Museum of Fine Arts, Richmond, Virginia
Wadsworth Atheneum, Hartford, Connecticut
Walker Art Center, Minneapolis, Minnesota
Whitney Museum of American Art, New York City, New York
Yale University Art Gallery, New Haven, Connecticut
Zimmerli Art Museum, Rutgers, The State University of New Jersey, New Brunswick.

Awards
Pindell has received a Guggenheim Fellowship in painting in 1987, the Most Distinguished Body of Work or Performance Award, granted by the College Art Association in 1990, the Studio Museum of Harlem Artist Award, the Distinguished Contribution to the Profession Award from the Women's Caucus for Art in 1996, two National Endowment for the Arts Fellowships and a United States Artists fellowship in 2020.

She also holds honorary doctorates from the Massachusetts College of Art and Design and Parsons The New School for Design.

References

External links
 Howardena Pindell, Free, White and 21 on MoMA Learning
 Howardena Pindell on artnet
 Howardena Pindell on The History Makers
 [* A Piece of Work podcast, WNYC Studios/MoMA, Abbi Jacobson and Thomas Lax discuss Free White and 21

1943 births
Living people
Painters from Pennsylvania
African-American women artists
20th-century American painters
21st-century American painters
Philadelphia High School for Girls alumni
Yale School of Art alumni
Boston University College of Fine Arts alumni
Artists from Philadelphia
Stony Brook University faculty
20th-century American women artists
21st-century American women artists
American women painters
American women academics
20th-century African-American women
20th-century African-American painters
21st-century African-American women
American women curators
American curators